The Bill Long Award is presented in recognition and appreciation of an individual who has made an outstanding contribution, and distinguished service to the Ontario Hockey League. The recipient must be or have been actively engaged in junior hockey. The Bill Long Award is not awarded annually, but rather bestowed upon notable achievements over time, as noted by the OHL board of governors. The award was initiated in 1989 to commemorate the efforts and contributions of Bill Long, spanning over three decades as a coach and manager of the Niagara Falls Flyers, Ottawa 67's, and the London Knights.

Recipients
List of recipients of the Bill Long Award.

See also
 List of Canadian Hockey League awards

References

External links
 Ontario Hockey League

Ontario Hockey League trophies and awards
Awards established in 1989